and  are 1999 role-playing video games developed by Game Freak and published by Nintendo for the Game Boy Color. They are the first installments in the second generation of the Pokémon video game series. They were released in Japan in 1999, Australia and North America in 2000, and Europe in 2001. Pokémon Crystal, a third version, was released a year later in each region. In 2009, on the 10th anniversary of Gold and Silver, remakes titled Pokémon HeartGold and SoulSilver were released for the Nintendo DS.

The games introduce 100 new species of Pokémon and follow the progress of the player character in their quest to master Pokémon battling. Both games are independent of each other but feature largely the same plot and, while both can be played separately, it is necessary to trade between these games and their predecessors in order to fully complete each games' Pokédex. The Johto Saga of the Pokémon anime is based on the new region introduced in the games.

Pokémon Gold and Silver were critically acclaimed upon release. They are considered by some to be the best games in the entire series, as well as some of the most significant games of the fifth generation of video game consoles. They continued the enormous success of Pokémon Red and Blue as Pokémon began to form into a multi-billion dollar franchise. The games almost matched the sales of Red and Blue, and by 2010 had gone on to sell over 23 million units making them the best-selling games for the Game Boy Color and the third-best-selling for the Game Boy family of systems.

Gameplay

Like previous installments, Pokémon Gold and Silver are played from a third-person, top-down perspective, with players directly navigating the protagonist around the fictional universe, interacting with objects and people. As the player explores this world, they will encounter different terrains, such as grassy fields, forests, caves, and seas in which different Pokémon species reside. As the player randomly encounters one of these creatures, the field switches to a turn-based "battle scene", where the Pokémon will fight.

There are two main goals within the games: following through the main storyline and defeating the Elite Four and Pokémon Master Lance to become the new Champion, and completing the Pokédex by capturing, evolving, and trading to obtain all 251 creatures. A major aspect of this is developing and raising the player's Pokémon by battling other Pokémon, which can be found in the wild or owned by other Trainers. This system of accumulating experience points (EXP) and leveling up, characteristic and integral to all Pokémon video games, controls the physical properties of the Pokémon, such as the battle statistics acquired, and the moves learned.

New features

While Pokémon Gold and Silver retain the basic mechanics of capturing, battling, and evolving introduced in Pokémon Red and Blue, new features were added. A time system was introduced using a real-time internal clock that keeps track of the current time and day of the week. Certain events, including Pokémon appearances, are influenced by this feature. New items were added, with some designed to exploit a new mechanic: Pokémon being able to hold items. A new type of item able to be held was the berry, which comes in varieties and can restore health or cure status effects. Other held items can give boosts to the Pokémon during battle. More specialized Poké Balls were introduced, which make Pokémon catching easier in certain situations. A new item called the Pokégear was introduced, functioning as a watch, map, radio, and phone, allowing the player to call other characters who offer their phone number. Trainers will call for a rematch and others will call about rare Pokémon that can be caught in a certain area.

The games introduce Raikou, Entei, and Suicune, some new types of legendary Pokémon that wander around Johto, changing locations frequently. They can be tracked by the Pokédex once encountered, and will always attempt to flee, but will retain HP loss. In addition, there is the possibility of encountering a shiny Pokémon, which have a different coloration than normal Pokémon of their species, and appear very rarely. Two new Pokémon types were added, the Steel-type and the Dark-type. Steel-type Pokémon are immune to Poison-type moves, and they have very high defense and resistance to other types, while Dark-type Pokémon are immune to Psychic-type moves and are strong against Psychic-type Pokémon (which provides an offensive strategy, formerly absent against Psychic-types), as well as having few weaknesses. In Gold and Silver, new moves were added, but Pokémon knowing these moves are not allowed to be traded to the first generation games. To solve this, a move deleter was introduced, capable of erasing moves known by the Pokémon. Another major change was the splitting of the "Special" stat into "Special Attack" and "Special Defense", which increased aspects of strategy.

With the introduction of Pokémon breeding, Pokémon are assigned to one or two breeding groups. When a male and female Pokémon that share at least one breeding group are left at a Pokémon Daycare, they may produce an egg, which will hatch into a young Pokémon. The young Pokémon will inherit the species of its mother, and moves from its father. However, legendary and mythical Pokémon, among certain other species, cannot breed.

Plot

Setting

Pokémon Gold and Silver are set in the region of Johto, situated to the west of the Kanto region from the previous Red and Blue games, and three years after the conclusion of the previous games. The design of Johto was inspired by Japan's Kansai and Tōkai regions, with many of the region's temples and more traditional Japanese aesthetics finding their way into Johto. The locations in the game within Johto include New Bark Town, Cherrygrove City, Violet City (キキョウシティ Kikyō City), Azalea Town (ヒワダタウン Hiwada Town), Goldenrod City (コガネシティ Kogane City), Ecruteak City (エンジュシティ Enju City), Olivine City (アサギシティ Asagi City), Cianwood City (タンバシティ Tanba City), Mahogany Town (チョウジタウン Chōji Town), and Blackthorn City (フスベシティ Fusube City). Most of the cities have one gym leader each, which serves as a boss, as do some of the towns.

Story

As with the previous games, the player character receives his first Pokémon, a choice between Chikorita, Cyndaquil, and Totodile, from the region's local Pokémon scientist, Professor Elm, and then begins his journey to win the eight Gym Badges of the Johto region and then challenge the Elite Four and Champion to become the region's new Pokémon Master. Opposing him is his mysterious rival, a boy who stole one of the other Pokémon from Professor Elm and regularly challenges the player to test his strengths. The player also encounters the villainous Team Rocket, having reunited to seek out their previous leader Giovanni to return the group to their former glory. Eventually, the player thwarts Team Rocket once and for all and defeats the Elite Four and Champion of the Pokémon League on Indigo Plateau. The player can then travel to the Kanto region from the previous games and challenge the Gym Leaders there, discovering how much has changed in the three years following the events of Red and Blue. After defeating the Kanto region's Gym Leaders, the player is allowed to enter the treacherous Mt. Silver area, home to very powerful Pokémon. Deep within Mt. Silver's caves is Red, the protagonist of Red and Blue, whom the player can challenge for the most difficult battle in the game.

Development
Gold and Silver were first publicly showcased at November 1997, Nintendo Space World Expo in Japan, becoming the most popular exhibit at the program. Unlike the previous game in the series, Pokémon Yellow, the new titles were announced to be more than a small upgrade to Pokémon Red and Blue. Instead, they would feature a new storyline, a new world, and new species of Pokémon. Gold and Silver were designed for the Game Boy Color, allowing them full color support and more detailed sprites. Other additions that were shown included Pokémon breeding, held items, an in-game gadget known as the PokéGear, a real-time internal clock, and backward compatibility with the previous games in the series.

During an ABC News interview, president of Creatures Inc. Tsunekazu Ishihara gave insight into the brainstorming process for developing new Pokémon species. He explained, "The ideas for each of these monsters came from the imagination of the software developers at Game Freak who get these ideas from their childhood experiences, including from reading manga, a style of Japanese comic books. Ideas come from scary experiences they had as kids, catching insects, and so forth. So from these experiences in childhood, these ideas for Pokémon came out". In the same vein as the Pokémon Mew of Red and Blue, the exclusive Pokémon Celebi was included in the Gold and Silver games but is only accessible after attending a Nintendo promotional event. The first official event offering Celebi was Nintendo Space World 2000 in Japan, in which 100,000 attendees would be awarded the rare Pokémon. In order to be selected, players had to send in a postcard to enter a lottery for one of 100,000 certificates of Celebi, allowing them to enter the event and obtain it.

Ishihara stated that Gold and Silver started development right after Pokémon Red and Green were released in Japan. The original intention was to release the game in 1998, even synchronizing with the supposed end of the anime's first season. Development issues, worsened by Game Freak being sidetracked with Pokémon Stadium and the localization of the first generation, led the game to be postponed, and the original release slate was taken over by Pokémon Yellow. Programmer Shigeki Morimoto stated that part of why development took three and a half years was due to being a small team of only four programmers. Satoru Iwata, then the president of HAL Laboratory who would later become Nintendo's CEO, helped the team by developing new tools for compressing the Pokémon graphic code.

Audio
Junichi Masuda composed his music on an Amiga computer, presumably in a music tracker format, converted to MIDI data and converted again to the Game Boy Color.

Unused Pokémon leak 

Four ROM images from the early-in-development Japanese-language demo were leaked during the 1997 Nintendo Space World presentation: two debug versions of the games, and two versions that were modified to work on normal Game Boy hardware and most emulators. These ROM images were only rumored to exist until they were anonymously posted on the "Pokémon Reverse Engineering Tools" (PRET) Discord server in May 2018. The demo was quickly shared with members of the website The Cutting Room Floor. The ROMs were analyzed and translated, and The Cutting Room Floor went on to release a spreadsheet containing all the information they had discovered, which includes a list of Pokémon species, Pokémon "moves", items, non-playable characters, maps, and music. The ROMs were first released anonymously onto 4chan's /vp/ board in May, with a formal The Cutting Room Floor release coming later that day. The demo has a larger world map than the final game (which itself is based on the entirety of Japan, unlike the final region, which is based on the Kansai region of Japan), and includes around 100 unused and changed Pokémon designs.

Earlier in May 2018, Pokémon artist Atsuko Nishida revealed that the popular creature Pikachu was originally supposed to have a third evolution, named "Gorochu". Additionally, Pokemon creator Satoshi Tajiri has revealed four unused designs that would have been included in the original Pokémon games.

While cut content is not uncommon in video games, the volume of cut content in the Gold and Silver demo has been described as "overwhelming". Matthew Byrd, writing for Den of Geek, stated that a lot of design work had gone into the Pokémon that were eventually cut, suggesting that Game Freak might have taken them out during the testing phase due to balance issues.

Release

In September 1999, the games were announced for release in Japan on November 21, 1999 and a North American release date was estimated for September 2000. Nintendo announced the release of the Pocket Pikachu Color, a full-color portable digital pet similar to the one released the year before. The unit is compatible with Gold and Silver, allowing the transfer of in-game currency known as "watt points". Pocket Pikachu Color was slated for release in Japan on November 21, 1999, the same day as the release of Gold and Silver. In addition, an officially licensed Pikachu-themed Game Link Cable developed by Kemco was set for release in Japan on November 18, 1999. The product functions like a normal Game Link Cable and consists of a yellow cable with a figure of Pikachu on one end, and a Poké Ball on the other.

Anticipating high sales, Nintendo set its first production shipment for the games in Japan at three million, predicting that eventually more than eight million copies would be sold in the country alone. However, they were soon forced to cut the first shipment number in half following an earthquake in Taiwan, which Nintendo claimed had damaged their cartridge manufacturing facilities. Regardless, speculation arose that Nintendo was instead using the event as an excuse to limit shipment and keep the demand high.

As a precursor to the North American release, Gold and Silver were displayed for audiences to interact with at the 2000 American International Toy Fair in New York City. To further promote the games, Nintendo modified five Chrysler PT Cruisers to resemble the new Pokémon Lugia and had them driven around the United States. The vehicles had fins and tails attached to them and were painted with logos and images of the Pokémon franchise. In addition, they were equipped with a television set hooked up to game consoles which allowed spectators to play Pokémon Puzzle League, Hey You, Pikachu!, and Pokémon Gold and Silver. The television series Pokémon GS, based on the games, was announced to be a part of the fall lineup on Kids' WB. The show features the same protagonist Ash Ketchum in a new region with different Pokémon species from the games. The localized English names of the 100 new Pokémon were kept confidential by Nintendo, with the company releasing names periodically. The domain names 'pokemongold.com' and 'pokemonsilver.com' were registered for this very purpose, and such names released included Chikorita, Lugia, Ho-Oh, Togepi, Hoothoot, and Marill.

In May 2000, Nintendo announced the official North American release date of Gold and Silver to be on 16 October of that year. Nintendo started accepting pre-orders for the games in August, and announced that consumers who pre-ordered one of the games would receive a free CD-ROM with a Pokémon-themed web browser developed by MediaBrowser which featured floating Pokémon species and links to Pokémon sites. The application was available for download on the official Pokémon website. The games had record sales as approximately 600,000 copies of them were pre-ordered in just two months, compared to Pokémon Yellows number of 150,000. As the release date neared, retailers such as Electronics Boutique reported receiving shipments of the games earlier than 16 October, and opted to sell them immediately; first giving them to pre-orderers and then selling the leftover copies. The games were reportedly obtainable as early as October 11.

The games were released in Australia on October 13, 2000 and in Europe on April 6, 2001.

Pokémon Crystal

 is a third version after Pokémon Gold and Silver, developed by Game Freak and published by Nintendo for the Game Boy Color. It was released in Japan on December 14, 2000, North America on July 29, 2001, and in Europe on November 2, 2001. Crystal was re-released worldwide via the Nintendo 3DS Virtual Console in January 2018. The gameplay and plot of Crystal is largely the same as Gold and Silver, save for several new features. It is the first Pokémon game to allow players to select their character's gender, whereas the default had been male. For the first time, Pokémon have brief animated sprites once entering battle; for example, when a Cyndaquil enters battle, the flames on its back flicker. This feature was absent in Pokémon Ruby and Sapphire and Pokémon FireRed and LeafGreen, before reappearing in Pokémon Emerald and all subsequent games. In addition, a couple of subplots were added, one involving the legendary Pokémon Suicune, featured on the front cover of the game, and the other involving the Unown. The game's most significant addition is the Battle Tower, a new building which allows players to participate in Pokémon Stadium-like fights. The Japanese edition of the game was exclusively bundled with the  a device that allowed for connecting with other players via a mobile phone.

Nintendo 3DS re-release
In June 2017, The Pokémon Company announced via a Pokémon Direct broadcast that the games would be re-released worldwide via the Nintendo 3DS Virtual Console on September 22, 2017. Pokémon Crystal, the third version of the second generation was also eventually re-released worldwide on the Nintendo 3DS Virtual Console on January 26, 2018.

Reception

Pokémon Gold and Silver were met with critical acclaim, with many saying that the extended length of gameplay and the new features were valued additions that kept the sequels as interesting as the original games. Craig Harris of IGN gave the games a "masterful" 10 out of 10 rating, stating that: "As awesome as the original Pokémon edition was, Pokémon Gold and Silver blow it away in gameplay elements, features, and goodies. There are so many little additions to the design it's impossible to list them all". There was particular praise given to the innovative internal clock feature, with Frank Povo of GameSpot, noting: "The first major addition to Pokémon GS is the presence of a time element... Although it may sound like a gimmick, the addition of a clock adds quite a bit of variety to the game". Povo went on to give the games an 8.8 rating of "great". Nintendo Power listed Gold and Silver combined as the sixth best Game Boy / Game Boy Color games, praising them for the new Pokémon, features, and full-color graphics.

Overall, Gold and Silver were stated to be solid gaming additions that would please a large audience. "After playing the game dozens of hours, I really can't think of a bad point to make about Pokémon Gold and Silver. Nintendo and Game Freak have tweaked the original and built a sequel that's long, challenging and tremendous fun to play. There's a reason why Pokémon is so popular, and Pokémon Gold and Silver is going to help the series move further into the 21st century", said Harris.

Crystal

Pokémon Crystal was well received by critics, although many commented that there were just not enough new additions and features to significantly set it apart from Pokémon Gold and Silver. Craig Harris of IGN stated "The final (hopefully) Game Boy Color edition is definitely the version to get if you aren't already one of the upteenth billion owners of the previous games, with Crystals slight updates to the design and graphics. But there's not much in this edition that makes it a "must buy" for folks who already own a copy or two of the previous editions". GameSpot nominated Crystal for its annual "Best Game Boy Color Game" award, which went to Oracle of Seasons and Oracle of Ages. The Australian Nintendo Gamer magazine gave a review score of 88 out of 100 and gave praise to the game's improvements from Gold and Silver including the option to choose either a male or female Pokémon trainer, enhanced graphics, more animated Pokémon battles and improved location navigation and stating “The main map and features of the game remain the same, but there are enough little differences to make it a worthwhile addition to your Pokémon game collection.”

Sales
Pokémon Gold and Silver continued the enormous success of Pokémon Red and Blue, beginning the formation of Pokémon into a multi-billion dollar franchise. Upon its first day of release in Japan, the game sold 1,425,768 units. As of April 2000, roughly 6.5 million copies of the games had been sold in Japan. Silver proved to be the slightly more popular version, edging out Gold by approximately 100,000 copies.

In the United States, the game generated  pre-sales about three weeks before release. Upon the first week of release in the United States, the games had eclipsed Pokémon Yellows previous record sales of a little over 600,000 copies; selling a combined total of 1.4 million copies to become the fastest-selling games ever. The commercial success was expected, as Peter Main, the executive vice president of sales and marketing, stated "There's no question about it; kids love to play Pokémon. So far in 2000 the best-selling game in America for any home console is Pokémon Stadium for Nintendo 64, and the best-selling game for any handheld video game system is Pokémon Yellow for Game Boy Color, but Pokémon Gold and Silver will eclipse even those impressive sales totals. We project sales of 10 million units total of these two games in less than six months time". The game sold  copies in the United States within a few weeks.

In Germany, Gold and Silver received two Double Platinum awards from the Verband der Unterhaltungssoftware Deutschland (VUD) for sales above 800,000 copies by 2002. In the United Kingdom, Gold and Silver received two Platinum awards for sales above 600,000 copies. By 2010, Gold and Silver had sold  units worldwide.

Pokémon Crystal has sold nearly 6.4 million units worldwide. Pokémon Crystal was the second-best-selling Game Boy Color game in Japan, with 1,871,307 copies sold. It has sold nearly 6.4 million units worldwide.

Legacy

Remakes

First released in Japan on September 12, 2009, the games were later released in North America, Australia, and Europe during March 2010.

Game director Shigeki Morimoto aimed to respect the feelings of those who played the previous games, while also ensuring that it felt like a new game to those that were introduced to the series in more recent years. Reception to the games was positive, the two being amongst the highest rated DS games of all time on Metacritic. Commercially, they are among the best-selling Nintendo DS games of all time, with combined sales of 10 million units as of July 2010.

A bootleg release of Pokémon Crystal called Pokémon Vietnamese Crystal, often shortened to Vietnamese Crystal is infamous for its poorly translated English text and gameplay oddities, such as profanity and calling Pokémon "elves".

Notes

References

External links

  (US)
  
 Crystal official website (US)
 Crystal official website 

1999 video games
Game Boy Color games
Game Freak games
Games with Transfer Pak support
Japanese role-playing video games
Video game sequels
Multiplayer and single-player video games
Gold, Silver, and Crystal
Role-playing video games
Video games developed in Japan
Video games featuring protagonists of selectable gender
Video games with alternative versions
Virtual Console games for Nintendo 3DS
Video games scored by Junichi Masuda
Video games scored by Go Ichinose